The Municipality of Dolenjske Toplice is a municipality near Novo Mesto in southeastern Slovenia. Its seat is the town of Dolenjske Toplice. The area is part of the traditional region of Lower Carniola. The municipality is now included in the Southeast Slovenia Statistical Region.

Settlements
In addition to the municipal seat of Dolenjske Toplice, the municipality also includes the following settlements:

 Bušinec
 Cerovec
 Dobindol
 Dolenje Gradišče
 Dolenje Polje
 Dolenje Sušice
 Drenje
 Gabrje pri Soteski
 Gorenje Gradišče
 Gorenje Polje
 Gorenje Sušice
 Kočevske Poljane
 Loška Vas
 Mali Rigelj
 Meniška Vas
 Nova Gora
 Občice
 Obrh
 Podhosta
 Podstenice
 Podturn pri Dolenjskih Toplicah
 Sela pri Dolenjskih Toplicah
 Selišče
 Soteska
 Stare Žage
 Suhor pri Dolenjskih Toplicah
 Veliki Rigelj
 Verdun pri Uršnih Selih

References

External links

Municipality of Dolenjske Toplice on Geopedia
 Dolenjske Toplice municipal site

Dolenjske Toplice
1998 establishments in Slovenia